Teebar is a locality in the Fraser Coast Region, Queensland, Australia.

Geography 
Eel Creek and Sandy Creek form the north-western boundary of the locality. Munna Creek forms the north-eastern boundary. Teebar Creek forms the south-eastern boundary. All of these creeks are ultimately tributaries of the Mary River.

The Brooweena Woolooga Road passes through the locality from south (Malarga) to north (Brooweena). Boompa Road enters the locality from the north-west (Boompa) and terminates at its junction with the Brooweena Woolooga Road in the north-west of the locality.

The principal land use is grazing on native vegetation.

History 

The runs of Crown Lands of Teebah, Wycalba, and Yarounbah were transferred during the period from 11 September 1854, to the 31st December, 1855 from Henry Cox Corfield to John Eaton.  John Eaton held Teebar until his death in 1904.

A copper mine and smelter were established in Teebar in 1873 by the Teebar Copper Mining Company Ltd. The location is described as being "north side of Munna Creek one and a half miles west of Clifton Station" and the ruins include a 100-ton slag heap.

In 1887,  of land were resumed from the Teebar pastoral run for the establishment of small farms. The land was offered for selection on 17 April 1887.

In 1922, the residents of the Woocoo Shire erected a war memorial outside St Mary's Church of England on the Maryborough-Biggenden Road at Teebar, (now within Boompa). In 1992 the memorial was relocated to the Woocoo Historical Museum in Brooweena due to concerns about vandalism. It is now known as the Brooweena War Memorial.
Elizabeth Mary Thomas nee Eaton, formerly Mrs B J Nichols, donated land from the property Clifton for a church and cemetery. Subscription towards the building fund were made on the understanding that the church was dedicated in the name of St Mary to the memory of Woocoo Shire soldiers killed in action in World War I. Opening services of the St Mary's Anglican Church were held on 26 October 1919. The church was built by Matthew Edmund Rooney of Maryborough. There is a group of three stained glass windows behind the altar. In 2019 residents and descendants of past residents attended a 100th anniversary service, and a plaque to commemorate the occasion was unveiled in the church grounds. The church is variously described as being located at Boompa, Brooweena, or Teebar.

Education 
There are no schools in Teebar. The nearest primary school is in Brooweena and the nearest secondary school is in Maryborough.

Events 
Teebar holds an annual agricultural show which includes  a campdraft and rodeo near the northern boundary of the locality.

Heritage listing 
Fraser Coast Regional Council has placed the following sites on its Local Heritage Register.-

 Teebar Hall and grounds, opened in 1918, at Teebar Hall Road Teebar
 St Mary’s Church and Cemetery at Maryborough Biggenden Road Brooweena

References

Further reading 

  —includes information on other schools: Braemar, Woocoo, Teebar East, Teebar West, Boompa, Idahlia, Dunmora, Musket Flat, Bowling Green, Aramara North, Aramara, and Gungaloon.

Fraser Coast Region
Localities in Queensland